"One Last Time" is a song recorded by American singer Ariana Grande for her second studio album My Everything. It was written by David Guetta, Savan Kotecha, Giorgio Tuinfort, Rami Yacoub, and Carl Falk. The song was produced by the latter two, with Tuinfort serving as a co-producer and Ilya serving both as a co-producer and vocal producer. "One Last Time" was first released on the iTunes Store on August 22, 2014, as the second promotional single from the album. On February 10, 2015, the song was sent to contemporary hit radio as the fifth and final single from the album. A French version of the song featuring French singer Kendji Girac, alternatively titled "Attends-moi", was released on February 16, 2015, in France, Belgium and Switzerland. It is also included on the deluxe version of Girac's debut studio album Kendji (2015). An Italian version of the song featuring Italian rapper Fedez was released on May 26, 2015, only in Italy.

"One Last Time" is a dance-pop and EDM song. Its instrumentation consists of sampled drums and a synth line. The single reached the top-twenty in twelve countries, including Australia, Canada, France, the United Kingdom and the United States, where it became Grande's sixth top-twenty single on the US Billboard Hot 100. The single's peak of number 13 on the US Billboard Hot 100 ended Grande's streak of consecutive top ten hits from 2014. It was later certified platinum by the Recording Industry Association of America (RIAA) and Australian Recording Industry Association (ARIA).

The song's accompanying music video was released on February 15, 2015, and was directed by Max Landis. The music video is visually presented as a found footage, similar to Landis' previous work. The video faced controversy due to its similarity to the music video for the Australian band SAFIA's single "You Are the One", with Grande and Landis being accused of intellectual property theft. Grande promoted the song with a live performance on The Tonight Show Starring Jimmy Fallon, the 2015 NBA All-Star Game halftime show, and during her first world tour, The Honeymoon Tour (2015).

Grande re-released "One Last Time" as a charity single in June 2017, following the Manchester Arena bombing at her concert the previous month. This resulted in the song reaching a new peak of number 2 on the UK Singles Chart following the One Love Manchester concert, as well as reaching a new peak of number 15 in the Irish Singles Chart and peaked at number one in Scotland. Grande donated all proceeds from the re-release to the We Love Manchester Emergency Fund to aid the victims of the bombing and their families. Overall, the song reached a top-ten peak in Belgium, the Czech Republic, France, Italy, Lebanon, the Netherlands, Slovakia, the United Kingdom and the top-twenty of Australia, Canada, Denmark, Ireland, Spain and the United States.

Background and release 

"One Last Time" was written by the songwriting team Savan Kotecha, Rami Yacoub and Carl Falk, with Dutch producer Giorgio Tuinfort and French disc jockey David Guetta. Kotecha had already previously collaborated with Grande when producing the first, second, third and fourth single from My Everything. Guetta was working on his album Listen, and while making the album he chose to give "One Last Time" to Grande, since "[he] had like 120 songs and [was] trying to make an album that ma[de] sense because some of the songs can be great, but that doesn’t mean that they would fit together. ["One Last Time" is] one example," he claimed. "One Last Time" was strongly considered to be My Everythings lead-single, according to Republic Records' executive vice president Charlie Walk, however "Problem" was chosen instead, being the song that best "set the tone for the project". Later, ""Break Free" felt like summer," Walk claimed, while "Bang Bang" helped usher in Jessie J's album Sweet Talker, and "fall/winter felt like the best time for "Love Me Harder", since it's a heavier, darker record," he added.

Before being released as an official single, "One Last Time" was released for free via iTunes Stores as the album's second promotional single on August 22, 2014, following "Best Mistake", which was released on August 12, 2014. Ultimately, "One Last Time" was released as the album's fifth and final single, being serviced to rhythmic crossover and contemporary hit radio stations on February 10, 2015, in the US. The song was also released in French as a duet with French singer Kendji Girac, winner of the third season of The Voice: la plus belle voix. The version titled "Attends-moi" (Wait for Me) was released in Belgium, France and Switzerland on February 16, 2015. It is included on the deluxe version of his debut studio album Kendji (2015). According to Girac, the duet was arranged by his artistic director, since he and Grande share the same music corporation, Universal Music Group. On May 26, 2015, an Italian version of the song featuring Italian rapper Fedez was released in Italy.

The song was re-released in June 2017 as a charity single, with proceeds being donated to the We Love Manchester Emergency Fund.

Composition

The song was produced by Falk and Yacoub, co-produced by Tuinfort and Ilya, with vocal production being done by Ilya, Kotecha and Yacoub. "One Last Time" is a dance-pop and EDM song, with a total length of three minutes and seventeen seconds (3:17). Its instrumentations consist in "pummeling drums and a three-note synth line". "One Last Time" is written in the key of A-flat major, with a moderately fast tempo of 125 beats per minute. Grande's vocals range from A3 to F5. Lyrically, the song describes a female protagonist who asks her former lover to spend one last time with her, even though they have already moved on from her and is with someone new. As noted by Jason Lipshut of Billboard, "the downbeat admission of 'I know/that you got everything/But I got nothing here without you' is the pained sound of a narrator racked with guilt, the chorus sets aside that humiliation and scoops up a sense of hope," with the singer pleading, "One last time/I need to be the one who takes you home/One more time/I promise after that, I'll let you go". Rob Copsey of The Official Charts Company noted that the song " reminded him of Swedish's recording artist, Loreen's 2012 Eurovision winning song "Euphoria".

Critical reception
Stephen Thomas Erlewine of AllMusic picked the song as one of the album's highlights, while Jason Lipshut of Billboard praised the track for "demonstrat[ing] Grande's newfound maturity and ambition". Rob Copsey wrote for the Official Charts Company that 'One Last Time' "suits her better than you’d think, [with] the singer reign[ing] in her powerful pipes on this breezy and wistful club track". while Anne Zaleski of The A.V. Club thought the song "channels a more powerful version of On the 6-era Jennifer Lopez," also calling it an "electronica-dusted [song]". AXS's Lucas Villa praised her performance for "exud[ing] sincerity and grace" and added that "[t]his baby-come-back tune showcases a softer side to the singer that highlights her dulcet vocals." FDRMX writer John Mychal Feraren gave "One Last Time" a rating of 4.2 out of 5 stars, calling it "an excellent addition to her list of hit songs" and claiming that "its astounding musical production is effortlessly matched by [the] singer's sultry voice [...] transform[ing] an empty song into a masterpiece." PPcorn.com described the song as "an excellent addition to her list of hit songs", declaring: "after the lyrical ambivalence of 'Love Me Harder', here comes a song that actually means something. It's about admitting your shortcomings in a previous relationship, and trying to make up for it. However, doesn't it sound a bit pathetic when your ex-lover tells you, 'Need to be the one who takes you home / One more time / I promise after that, I'll let you go.'"

Mikael Wood, while reviewing the album for Los Angeles Times, called it a "delight [with] surging dance beats," while Digital Spys Lewis Corner named it a "restrained sibling" of "Break Free", having "speckles of electronica to save it from falling into dwindling balladry". Jean-Luc Marsh of Pretty Much Amazing noted that the "otherworldly notes that Grande hits on 'One Last Time' and 'Why Try' remain standouts several listens through". Similarly, The Nationals Adam Workman claimed Grande is "far more effective when she leaves the musical school of 'why sing one note when you can stretch it out for several bars across three different octaves?'," citing the "lower-key" song as an example. Kathy Iandoli from Idolator labeled it ".. smooth yet eerily resemble when an adult contemporary artist attempts dance music..." Nick Levine of Time Out concluded that the song "serves club pop with a side of melancholy". In contrast, Evan Sawdey of PopMatters observed that the song "strikes all the dance-pop and EDM-lite poses it needs to without leaving any significant impression afterwards".

Commercial performance
After being released as a promotional single for the parent album in August 2014, "One Last Time" initially debuted at number 11 on the US Bubbling Under Hot 100 Singles chart, before officially debuting on the US Billboard Hot 100 at number 80 on the week of February 28, 2015. The song jumped to number 34 the following week, while staying behind Grande's "Love Me Harder". It later climbed to number 18, becoming Grande's fifth consecutive top-twenty single from the same album and sixth overall. The song eventually peaked at number 13, on the week of May 2, 2015, becoming Grande's first radio promoted song from My Everything to not enter the top ten in the country, effectively ending Grande's streak of consecutive top ten hits from 2014. On the Mainstream Top 40 chart, the song peaked at number six, also becoming her fifth top ten single on the Pop charts. As of June 2020, "One Last Time" had sold 918,000 digital units in the US, and was certified Platinum by the RIAA. Similar to the US, the song has also become her fifth consecutive top-twenty single in Canada, peaking at number 12.

In Australia, "One Last Time" debuted on the ARIA Charts on the week of March 8, 2015 at number 27 and went on to reach a peak of number 15 on April 5, 2015, becoming her fifth top-twenty single there. Meanwhile, in New Zealand the song debuted at number 32, and a week later it peaked at number 22. It was higher than her previous single, "Love Me Harder", which peaked at number 28, and promotional single "Best Mistake", which charted at number 29.

Across Europe, "One Last Time" proved to be moderately successful initially. In France, both versions of the song charted; the original version of the song reached number ten, becoming her highest charting-single there and her first top-ten single, while the French version, "Attends-moi" with Kendji Girac, debuted and peaked at number 11, becoming her highest single debut, second highest charting-single and third top-twenty there. In Italy, the song peaked at number six on the FIMI Singles Chart, becoming her first top-ten hit in that country, and was certified double platinum by the FIMI.

In the United Kingdom,  "One Last Time" originally peaked at number 24 on the UK Singles Chart in early 2015, marking Grande's fourth top-forty single in the country, following number one singles "Problem" and "Bang Bang" as well as top-twenty single "Break Free". It was later certified gold by the BPI for reaching 400,000 sales+streaming figures. As of March 2021, "One Last Time" is Grande's fourth most-streamed song in the United Kingdom and overall 24th most-streamed song by a female artist in the country.

Resurgence of media attention
In the wake of the Manchester Arena bombing, a resurgence of popularity and meaning for the single came as a homage to the victims of the incident, with Grande's fans starting petitions to get the song charting again. The song re-entered charts across several countries, including the UK, where it subsequently rose to a new peak of number two on the UK Singles Chart following the One Love Manchester benefit concert, as well as a new chart peak of number sixteen in Ireland, which was topped the week after by a chart move to number fifteen. It was certified platinum soon after, on June 9, 2017, by the BPI for selling over 600,000 copies, and then double platinum on February 23, 2018, for shipments of over 1.2 million copies in the country, her first single to do so. In Scotland, "One Last Time" also re-entered following the incident, and eventually topped the Scottish Singles chart on the issue dated June 9, 2017. The song also reached number 35 on the Australian ARIA Singles Chart, and number 23 in France and number 11 in Spain.

Copyright infringement lawsuit 
In August 2016, Alex Greggs filed a lawsuit against Grande, David Guetta, Rami Yacoub, Carl Falk, Universal Music Group and Republic Records for alleged copyright infringement of the song "Takes All Night" by Skye Stevens, which Greggs wrote. The lawsuit alleged that the "harmonic background remains the same in both songs for the entire sixteen measures of the chorus. ... Although the rhythm of the two compositions may differ ... there is substantial similarity on the most important rhythmic placement of the pitches on strong melodic and harmonic beats (1 and 3)". Greggs sought $150,000 per infringement. The case was later dismissed after both sides filed a Joint Stipulation for Dismissal.

Music video

Background

Grande came up with the idea of the music video and contacted Max Landis, known for his 2012 film Chronicle. In an interview, Grande explained: "It's very unique, it's very different, I called Max [Landis] up and I said 'hey I want to do something that ends exactly like this' and I described the ending shot to him and then I said I also want it to be (a) one take [music video]… and I want the ending shot to look like this, And I described those two things to him and he’s like, 'wow, that's ambitious and it’s brave and it’s different, but let's try it". A day later, Grande discussed the video's concept and said that it was "the coolest concept ever and he killed it and it's very different. I'm very nervous about it because it's so unique and weird and I feel like brave and different, but it’s exciting".

The music video was filmed in early January 2015 and it also stars Matt Bennett, who was also Grande's co-star from the Nickelodeon sitcom Victorious. Max Landis also confirmed that one of the voices of the news reporters in the beginning of the video was actress Elizabeth Gillies, who also co-starred in Victorious with Grande and Bennett. Gillies previously appeared Grande's music video for her single "Right There" (2013). Around that time, Max Landis revealed "One Last Time" as Grande's next single after tweeting, "Earth will pass catastrophically through the tail of the comet Eurydice in one week. Gather family and lovers close, one...last...time". The lyric video for "One Last Time" was released on Grande's official Vevo on February 6, 2015, at the same time it was announced that the music video was finished. On February 12, 2015, three days before the release of the music video, Grande released a teaser of the music video via Instagram. The music video was visually presented as a found footage, similar to Landis' previous work Chronicle. The "One Last Time" music video was released on February 15, 2015, on Vevo. It surpassed 100 million views on June 8, making it Grande's sixth Vevo-certified music video after "Love Me Harder".

Synopsis 
The music video displays news anchor reports about the Earth on course to pass through the tail of a comet named Eurydice, as well as displaying a worldwide panic. The rest of the video then is presented through the use of a handheld video camera. Grande is in a Fiat car as the passenger, with her boyfriend (played by Matt Bennett), who is recording. They are stuck in traffic as they try to leave the city, implied to be Los Angeles, California. While everyone around them is panicking, Grande seems to be calm as she wants to get a closer look at the comet. Impatient, she leaves the car while Bennett tries to stop her, and then follows. They make their way through the crowds, but are stopped by the police who are barricading the street. Meanwhile, the comet erupts in the sky and begins to crash to the ground as the song starts. Grande manages to get through but Bennett is unable to, so he goes through an open ambulance and manages to catch up with her in an alleyway with stairs leading up into an apartment complex. Ariana notices the comet in the sky. The two enter a home of a frightened family and try to leave through the other door, only for the comet to crash into the building, nearly killing both of them. Frightened, the two continue on and enter a room filled with television screens of the comet and an old man sitting at a desk. As the former two of them try to leave, the latter tries to stop them, but they knock him to the ground, and all the screens change to the same countdown timer.  Grande and Bennett eventually make their way up the rooftop after subduing the old man again, who had caught up with them. The camera is then set down, and shows the two of them embracing each other One Last Time until the comet crashes down, destroys everything and leads the Earth to an end.

Reception and plagiarism allegations
Ariana Bacle of Entertainment Weekly called the music "very Chronicle", comparing the video to Max Landis' previous work. Rachel Paoletta of MTV News describes the music video as "a decidedly darker and more badass video" compared to her "sexy, sultry, and sandy video for 'Love Me Harder'". She also stated that "Ariana Grande's new video takes us to the end of the world, and brings us to the edge of our seats". In response to similarities between the Grande video and the music video accompanying Australian band SAFIA's single "You Are the One", Grande and Landis were accused of intellectual property theft. The controversy centered on similarities in the shared apocalyptic themes and stylistic format (a single, tracking shot) as well as parallels in the beginning of both videos (where a female protagonist exits a vehicle despite the protests of the male driver) and final shot (a lover's embrace as the world comes to an end around them). Members of the band described the similarities as an instance of when "big labels and/or big film firms steal ideas from small independent creatives who are trying really hard to make something different for a change". Despite acknowledging similarities between the two videos, Landis denied that his ideas are stolen from them and commented that both music videos had much in common with a third earlier music video by Perth group Injured Ninja.

Live performances
Grande performed "One Last Time" for the first time live on The Tonight Show Starring Jimmy Fallon on February 1, 2015. She sang the song once more at the NBA All-Star Game halftime show on February 15, 2015, along with her other past hit songs. During "One Last Time", she introduced the song "with some fluttering notes that eventually congealed into an impressive melisma", as noted by Billboards Jason Lipshut. "One Last Time" has also been on her setlists for The Honeymoon Tour and the Dangerous Woman Tour. During The Honeymoon Tour in Paris on May 15, 2015, Grande performed the French version of "One Last Time" with Kendji Girac for the first time. On May 27, 2015, she sang the song on the third season finale of The Voice of Italy.

On June 4, 2017, Grande performed "One Last Time", joined on-stage by other participating artists, as part of the finale of One Love Manchester, a benefit concert for the victims of the Manchester Arena bombing.

Grande performed a shortened version of One Last Time during her BBC special aired end of 2018. 

From March 18 to April 5, 2019, Grande included a shortened remix of "One Last Time" on her Sweetener World Tour setlist. The song was however later removed due to emotional reasons. An acoustic version of the song was later performed during her set at Manchester Pride on August 25, 2019.

Track listing
 Digital download 

 Digital download – French version 

 Digital download – Italian version

 Digital download – Marshmello Remix

Credits and personnel
Credits adapted from My Everything liner notes.

Recording and management
Recorded at Conway Recording Studios (Los Angeles, California) and Kinglet Studios (Stockholm, Sweden)
Mixed at MixStar Studios (Virginia Beach, Virginia)
Mastered at Sterling Sound (New York City, New York)
What a Publishing, Ltd., MXM Music (ASCAP) (administered by Kobalt), Piano Songs/Talpa Music (BUMA), Piano Music/Sony/ATV (BMI), Rami Productions/Team 2101 Songs (administered by Sony/ATV), Team 2101 Songs (administered by Sony/ATV)

Personnel

Ariana Grande – lead vocals
Carl Falk – songwriting, production, programming, guitars
Rami – songwriting, production, vocal production, vocal editing, programming
David Guetta – songwriting
Giorgio Tuinfort – songwriting, co-production
Savan Kotecha – songwriting, vocal production, background vocals
Ilya – co-production for Wolf Cousins Productions, vocal production, vocal editing
Peter Carlsson – vocal engineering
Jeanette Olsson – background vocals
Eric Weaver – engineering
Serban Ghenea – mixing
John Hanes – mixing engineering
Tom Coyne – mastering
Aya Merrill – mastering

Charts

Weekly charts

Year-end charts

Decade-end charts

Certifications and sales

|-

Release history

References

External links
 Official website
 

2010s ballads
2014 songs
2015 singles
Ariana Grande songs
Charity singles
Kendji Girac songs
Electronic dance music songs
Music video controversies
Songs involved in plagiarism controversies
Republic Records singles
Song recordings produced by Ilya Salmanzadeh
Song recordings produced by Savan Kotecha
Songs about infidelity
Songs written by Carl Falk
Songs written by David Guetta
Songs written by Giorgio Tuinfort
Songs written by Savan Kotecha
Torch songs
Pop ballads
Songs written by Rami Yacoub
Macaronic songs
Films directed by Max Landis
Number-one singles in Scotland
Male–female vocal duets
Song recordings produced by David Guetta